Peking Union Medical College, founded in 1906, is a selective public medical college based in Dongcheng, Beijing, China. It is a Chinese Ministry of Education Double First Class University Plan university. The school is tied to the Peking Union Medical College Hospital and has a joint 8-year clinical medicine science program with Tsinghua University.

Peking Union Medical College students in the 8-year clinical medicine program could receive a Peking Union Medical College diploma and degree signed by both the Peking Union Medical College and Tsinghua presidents. It was merged with the Chinese Academy of Medical Sciences in 1957 and operates as one single institution with two names directly under the Ministry of Health, now the National Health Commission. It is the first medical school in China to introduce the 8-year M.D. program.

History 

The Peking Union Medical College Hospital was founded in 1906. The American Board of Commissioners for Foreign Missions, the Board of Foreign Missions of the Presbyterian Church in the U.S.A., the London Missionary Society, and later, the Board of Foreign Missions of the Methodist Episcopal Church, the Society for the Propagation of the Gospel, and the Medical Missionary Association of London, together with the then-Chinese government cooperated in the foundation and development of the Medical College and maintained it until 1915. The Rockefeller Foundation was established in 1913 and in 1913-1914 the newly formed Foundation created a Commission, including Dr. Franklin C. McLean, to examine medical education in China. Dr Wu Lien-teh strongly supported the establishment of a new medical college in Peking and made a number of recommendations, all of which were adopted. One of its recommendations was that the Foundation - through a subsidiary organization - should assume financial responsibility for the college. On July 1, 1915 the recently established China Medical Board assumed full support of the Union Medical College, having previously acquired the property. The commission's members had included both William Welch, the first Dean of the Johns Hopkins Medical School, and Simon Flexner. The China Medical Board modeled the school after Johns Hopkins University School of Medicine following the recommendations of the Flexner Report, which set the foundation of modern Medical Education in the United States and Canada. The PUMC was reorganized in 1917 and celebrated its 90th anniversary with a ceremony attended by the President of Johns Hopkins University, the Chair of the China Medical Board and representatives of the Rockefeller family and Rockefeller Brothers Fund. John Black Grant, M.D., M.P.H. was a founding faculty member of PUMC and served from 1921 to 1938 as Professor and Chair of its Department of Public Health. Dr. Grant is the father of James P. Grant, the third executive director of UNICEF.

In January 1951, the new government nationalized PUMC, and the institution was accused of being an agent of American cultural imperialism. The Ministry of Health changed its name to China Union Medical College but did not radically alter the curriculum except to switch the language of instruction from English to Chinese. In 1952 the People's Liberation Army took charge of operations and remained in charge until 1956. The curriculum was militarized and shortened to one year in order to train army medical officers, and Soviet models were introduced. The basic orientation to Western medicine was maintained and the staff continued to do research and advanced surgeries.

In 1956, autonomy was restored, but the college continued to be criticized for its elitism, cosmopolitanism, and failure to "serve the people" during periodic campaigns.  During the Cultural Revolution, the Peking Union Medical College was closed, and the hospital was renamed the Beijing Anti-Imperialism Hospital (北京反帝醫院). In 1979, it reopened as the "Capital University of Medical Sciences" then returned to Peking Union Medical College (协和医科大学) in 1985.

Current status

Peking Union Medical College students traditionally attend Peking University biology department for their pre-meds portion of education. Since 2002, Tsinghua University has held a joint MD program in clinical medical science. Enrollment in the clinical medical science at PUMC is based on individual's performance in high school and National Exam score at graduation. The curriculum of clinical medical science is 8 years, accepts about 90 students each year and includes 2.5 years of pre-medical education in the School of Life Sciences at Tsinghua University; the students have their pre-med studies at Tsinghua University and are considered as students of both PUMC and Tsinghua University. The college also has its independent Graduate School, which recruits from other medical schools around the country. The health care services at Peking Union Medical College Hospital are widely believed in mainland China to be among the most technically advanced. Many prominent political and social leaders in China have sought medical treatment at the PUMC Hospital.

Peking Union Medical College has provided generations of leaders for academic and clinical medicine and related areas all over the world.

Peking Union Medical College is part of the Project 211 list of universities receiving national funding.

Rankings and reputation 
Peking Union Medical College is listed as one of the top 400 universities in the World University Rankings. It is consistently ranked among the top medical schools in China and has ranked in the top 1 or 2 best nationwide, together with Capital Medical University among Chinese Medical Universities in the recognized Best Chinese Universities Ranking.

As of 2022, its "Biomedical Engineering" and "Public Health" were ranked in the top 75 in the world, while "Pharmacy & Pharmaceutical Sciences" and "Nursing" were placed in the top 150 in the world by the Academic Ranking of World Universities.  As of 2022, its "Clinical Medicine" also ranked #121 globally by the U.S. News & World Report.

Research 
The medical school is the home to 4 state key labs and 6 WHO collaborating centers including the:
WHO Collaborating Center for Health and Biomedical Information
WHO Collaborating Center for the Family of International Classification (WHO-FIC)
WHO Collaborating Center for Nursing Policy-Making and Quality Management
WHO Collaborating Center for Traditional Medicine
WHO Collaborating Centre for the Community Control of Hereditary Diseases (Thalassemia)
WHO Collaborating Centre for the Prevention and Control of Sexually Transmitted Infections
The State Key Laboratory of Molecular Oncology
The State Key Laboratory of Medical Molecular Biology
The State Key Laboratory of Bio-active substances and the function of natural medicines
The State Key Laboratory of Experimental Hematology

Hospitals
Peking Union Medical College Hospital, Beijing
Fuwai Hospital, Beijing
Cancer Hospital, Beijing
Plastic Surgery Hospital, Beijing
Hematology Hospital, Tianjin
Skin Disease Hospital, Nanjing

Notable alumni
 Chen Jirui (Jerry Chen)
 Xin Lu
 Tang Feifan
 Pei Hsien Tang
 Tsai-Fan Yu
 Wu Jieping
 Jin Xianzhai
 Tian Gang Gary
 Wang Haiqiu Elaine
Liang, Ping Yee

Gallery

See also 
Tsinghua Shenzhen International Graduate School
Tsinghua-Berkeley Shenzhen Institute

References

Citations

Sources 

 
 Bullock, Mary Brown. An American Transplant: The Rockefeller Foundation and the Peking Union Medical College (Berkeley: University of California Press, 1980).
 McLean, Franklin C, Ph.D., Guide to the Franklin C. McLean Papers 1881-1969 (Special Collections Research Center, University of Chicago Library, 2006).

External links 

 Official Website
 100 Years: The Rockefeller Foundation, China Medical Board

Tsinghua University
Peking Union Medical College
Universities and colleges in Beijing
Medical schools in China
Educational institutions established in 1906
Major National Historical and Cultural Sites in Beijing
Vice-ministerial universities in China
Plan 111
Rockefeller Foundation
1906 establishments in China